The 1963 New York Mets season was the second regular season for the Mets. They went 51–111 and finished 10th in the NL, 48 games behind the World Series Champion Los Angeles Dodgers. They were managed by Casey Stengel. They played their home games at the Polo Grounds, the second and final season there for the Mets before moving to Shea Stadium the following season.

Offseason 

 October 11, 1962: Ron Hunt was purchased by the Mets from the Milwaukee Braves.
 October 14, 1962: Norm Sherry and Dick Smith were purchased by the Mets from the Los Angeles Dodgers.
 November 26, 1962: Paul Blair was drafted from the Mets by the Baltimore Orioles in the 1962 first-year draft.

Regular season 
On June 14, Duke Snider of the Mets hit his 400th home run against the Cincinnati Reds. The opposing pitcher was Bob Purkey. The homer came in the 6,783rd at bat of his career. Snider became the ninth player to reach 400 homers. Along with Eddie Mathews, Snider became part of the first duo to reach the 400-plateau in the same season. Afterwards, Mets outfielder Jimmy Piersall told Snider that he could get more publicity for his 100th home run. Nine days later, on June 23, Piersall ran the bases backward after hitting the 100th home run of his career off Philadelphia Phillies pitcher Dallas Green. He was released by the Mets one month later, with that home run being the only one he hit in a Mets uniform.

Season standings

Record vs. opponents

Notable transactions 
 May 8, 1963: Larry Foss was traded by the Mets to the Milwaukee Braves for Chico Fernández.
 May 23, 1963: Gil Hodges was traded by the Mets to the Washington Senators for Jimmy Piersall.
 July 1, 1963: Charlie Neal and Sammy Taylor were traded by the Mets to the Cincinnati Reds for Jesse Gonder.
 July 29, 1963: Jacke Davis and cash were traded by the Mets to the St. Louis Cardinals for Duke Carmel.
 July 27, 1963: Jimmy Piersall was released by the Mets.
 September 5, 1963: Ron Swoboda was signed as an amateur free agent by the Mets.

Roster

Player stats

Batting

Starters by position 
Note: Pos = Position; G = Games played; AB = At bats; H = Hits; Avg. = Batting average; HR = Home runs; RBI = Runs batted in

Other batters 
Note: G = Games played; AB = At bats; H = Hits; Avg. = Batting average; HR = Home runs; RBI = Runs batted in

Pitching

Starting pitchers 
Note: G = Games pitched; IP = Innings pitched; W = Wins; L = Losses; ERA = Earned run average; SO = Strikeouts

Other pitchers 
Note: G = Games pitched; IP = Innings pitched; W = Wins; L = Losses; ERA = Earned run average; SO = Strikeouts

Relief pitchers 
Note: G = Games pitched; W = Wins; L = Losses; SV = Saves; ERA = Earned run average; SO = Strikeouts

Awards and honors 
All-Star Game
 Duke Snider, outfield, reserve

Farm system

Notes

References 
1963 New York Mets at Baseball Reference
1963 New York Mets team page at www.baseball-almanac.com

External links 

 1963 New York Mets season at Baseball Reference

New York Mets seasons
New York Mets season
New York Mets
1960s in Manhattan
Washington Heights, Manhattan